The BSWW Tour is a series of international events in beach soccer. It is organised by Beach Soccer Worldwide (BSWW), an organization responsible for promotion and development of beach soccer sport. BSWW Tour is an international exhibition tour in beach soccer allowing teams to practice and compete in beach soccer as well as to allow spectators to see the sport. The tour holds events in different locations around the world.

First started in 1996, the series were called the Pro Beach Soccer Tour (PBST) until 2004 when partnership with FIFA started.

Divisions

Division 1
 Spain France Portugal Brazil Austria Italy

Division 2
 England Switzerland Netherlands United Arab Emirates Morocco Belgium

1993 unofficial

1st Miami Cup Nov. in Miami Beach, USA

Brazil 10-3 USA 
 Argentina -  Italy 

Third place match:  USA /  Italy  ?

Final
Brazil 2-1 Argentina

1994 unofficial

 Friendly Match
July in Hermosa Beach, USA
Brazil 5-3 USA

1995 unofficial

2nd Miami Cup June 2–4 in Miami Beach, USA

 USA 7-6 Argentina  [OT; on pen]
Brazil 13-9 Mexico  
 Mexico 4-3 USA 
Brazil 2-1 Argentina  
 Argentina 3-2 Mexico  
Brazil 10-3 USA  
[5 goals of Zico]

Table:
1. Brazil 3  3 0  25-13  6 
2.  Argentina	3  1 2  10-11  2 
3.  Mexico 3  1 2  15-19  2 
4.  USA 3  1 2  13-20  2

Intercontinental Cup July 1995 in Miura, Japan

Semifinals
 South Korea	8-3 Japan  
Brazil 9-4 Argentina 

Third place match
 Argentina 13-2 Japan 

Final 
Brazil 11-3 South Korea

1996

02/03/1996	Buenos Aires (Argentina)Argentina	5-12	Brazil		Friendly Match 1996	

Copa del Sol March in Buenos Aires

 Argentina 5-12 Brazil 

World tour of Brazil June 12–13 in Brighton
 USA 3-6 Brazil 
 Italy 3-12 Brazil 

World tour of Brazil June in Marseille
 Italy 6-9 Brazil 
 USA 2-3 Brazil 

World tour of Brazil July in La Panne
 USA 4-9 Brazil 
 Italy 4-9 Brazil 

World tour of Brazil July in Alicante
 Italy 2-8 Brazil 
 USA 0-4 Brazil 

World tour of Brazil July in Rotterdam
 Netherlands 4-13 Brazil 
 Italy 4-3 Brazil 

World tour of Brazil Aug in Budva, Yugoslavia
 England	1-13 Brazil 
 Italy 4-5 Brazil 

World tour of Brazil Nov in Kuala Lumpur
 Malaysia 1-14 Brazil 
 Italy 3-5 Brazil 

Intercontinental Cup July 1996 in Okinawa, Japan

Semifinals

Brazil 15-2 Japan 
 South Korea	 -   Italy 

Third place match
 Japan /  Italy

Final
Brazil 6-4 South Korea

1997

3rd Miami Cup April 12–13 in Miami Beach, United States

 Brazil 7-4 Argentina  
 USA  -  Spain 

Third place match:  Argentina 2-3  Spain 
Final:  Brazil		8-7 USA 

World tour of Brazil May 16–17 in Kuala Lumpur
 Malaysia 4-10 Brazil 
 USA 2-4 Brazil 

World tour of Brazil July 12–13 in Travemünde
 USA 3-10 Brazil 
 Italy 1-5 Brazil 

World tour of Brazil July 19–20 in Budva, Yugoslavia
 Spain 2-4 Brazil 
  Yugoslavia 2-5 Brazil 

World tour of Brazil July 26–27 in Alicante
 USA 3-5 Brazil 
 Spain 6-8 Brazil 

BSWW tour Aug 20-27 in Shirako, Japan

 Brazil 13-5 France  
 Brazil	11-1 Canada 
 Brazil	5-2 Uruguay  
 USA  -  Portugal  
 USA  -  Argentina  
 USA  -  Japan 

Semifinals 
 Brazil 13-4 Portugal 
 USA  - France 

Third place match:  Portugal -  France 

Final:  Brazil	9-5 USA 

Gala match Sep 21 in Monte-Carlo

 Prince Albert Sel.	7-5 Spain

1998

20/05/1998	Kuala Lumpur (Malaysia)		Malaysia	3-6	Brazil		Friendly Match 1998	
21/05/1998	Kuala Lumpur (Malaysia)		Malaysia	4-7	Brazil		Friendly Match 1998	
30/05/1998	Oviedo (Spain)			Spain		4-7	Brazil		Friendly Match 1998	
31/05/1998	Madrid (Spain)			Spain		2-1	Brazil		Friendly Match 1998	
20/09/1998	Monte Carlo (Monaco)		Brazil		4-2	Portugal	Friendly Match 1998	

World tour of Brazil May 22–23 in Kuala Lumpur
 Malaysia 3-6 Brazil  
 Malaysia 4-7 Brazil 

May in Oviedo
 Spain 4-7 Brazil 

May 27 in Madrid
 Europa Sel.	2-7 Brazil 
 Spain 2-1 Brazil 

Gala matches Sep 19-20 in Monte-Carlo

 Prince Albert Sel.	9-14 Brazil 
 Portugal 2-4 Brazil  
 Prince Albert Sel.	2-6 Yugoslavia 

Telekom Cup Dec 4-5 in Wien - Austria
 Germany 10-6 Austria 
 
 Yugoslavia	7-4

Third place match:  Austria 4-2  Italy 
Final:  Yugoslavia	6-4 Germany

1999

21/09/1999	Monte Carlo (Monaco)		Brazil		7-5	France		Friendly Match 1999	

Pré-mundial Jan 6-7 in Puenta del Este - Argentina
Third place match:  Argentina 3-2 Portugal 

Final:  Brazil 5-4 Uruguay 

World Series Sept 3-5 in Alicante, Spain
 USA 4-2 Japan 
 Brazil 11-3 South Africa 
 Portugal 5-3 France  
 Spain 9-2  Italy 

Semifinals 5-8
 Japan 7-3 South Africa  
 France 8-7  Italy 

Semifinals 1-4
 Brazil 7-1 USA 
 Spain 6-2 Portugal 

Seventh place match:  Italy 6-5 South Africa  
Fifth place match:  France 7-4 Japan  
Third place match:  Portugal 3-1 USA  
Final:  Brazil 7-1 Spain 

Gala match Sep 19-21 in Monte-Carlo

 Prince Albert Sel.	5-7 Brazil  
 France 5-7 Brazil

2000

Copa do Descobrimento March in Porto Seguro, Brazil

 Brazil		11-2 Portugal  
 Spain 10-2 France  
 France 6-5 Portugal  
 Brazil		4-0 Spain  
 Spain 5-2 Portugal  
 Brazil		11-10 France 

Table:
1.  Brazil	3  3 0 0  26-12  9 
2.  Spain 	3  2 0 1  15- 8  6 
3.  France	3  1 0 2  18-26  3 
4.  Portugal 3  0 0 3   9-22  0

BSWW tour April 12–14 in Dubai, United Arab Emirates

 Spain 3-1  Italy  
 Brazil	12-7 France  
 France 7-5 Spain  
 Brazil	7-1  Italy  
 France 6-5  Italy  
 Spain 5-4 Brazil 

Table:
1.  Brazil 3  2 0 1  23-13  6 
2.  Spain 3  2 0 1  13-12  6 
3.  France 3  2 0 1  20-22  6 
4.  Italy 	3  0 0 3   7-16  0

BSWW tour July 14–16 in Alanya - Turkey

 Germany 6-5 Turkey  
 Brazil	11-1 Spain  
 Spain 6-5 Turkey  
 Brazil	14-0 Germany  
 Spain 10-4 Germany  
 Brazil	14-5 Turkey 

Table:
1.  Brazil 3  3 0 0  9 
2.  Spain 3  2 0 1  6 
3.  Germany 3  1 0 2  3 
4.  Turkey 3  0 0 3  0

2001

Intercontinental Cup Jan 12-14 at Parque Villa Lobos in São Paulo, Brazil

 Brazil	11-3 Turkey  
 USA - Italy  
 Brazil	12-1  Italy  
 USA -  Turkey  
 Turkey 7-5  Italy  
 Brazil	6-2 USA 

1.  Brazil 
2.  USA  
3.  Turkey 
4.  Italy

BSWW tour April 18–20 in Dubai, UAE

 France 7-3 UAE  
 Italy 2-0 Spain  
 Germany 3-2 England  
 France 4-3  Italy  
 UAE 8-5 England  
 Spain 7-2 Germany  
 Germany 9-3 UAE  
 Italy 5-1 England  
 France 6-4 Spain 

Table:
1.  France 3  3 0 0  9 
2.  Italy 3  2 0 1  6 
3.  Germany 3  2 0 1  6 
4.  Spain 	3  1 0 2  3 
5.  UAE 3  1 0 2  3 
6.  England 3  0 0 3  0

World League June 29 to July 1 in Acapulco, Mexico
 Brazil	3-2 Portugal  
 Spain  -  Mexico  
 Brazil	4-2 Spain  
 Portugal -  Mexico  
 Brazil	5-3 Mexico   
 Portugal -  Spain 

Winner:  Brazil

BSWW tour Dec 15-16 in Lyon, France

 Brazil		11-5 Spain  
 France 6-4 Argentina 

Third place match:  Argentina	5-4 Spain 

Final:  Brazil 8-2 France 

Gala match May 12 in Bangkok, Thailand
 France 6-5 Thailand

Gala matches Sep 2-3 in Monte-Carlo
 Prince Albert Sel.	6-6  Scandinavia	[OT; 2-1 on pen] 
 Portugal 13-5 Scandinavia 
 Spain 6-5  Scandinavia	[OT]

2002

BSWW tour Aug 24-25 in Knokke - Belgium

 France 9-4 Belgium  
 Germany 9-7  Italy 

Third place match:  Belgium 8-4  Italy 

Final:  France 4-2 Germany

2003

BSWW tour July 20–21 in Athinai

 Greece 4-8 Brazil  
 Greece 3-14 Brazil

2004

Trophée des Arènes June 4–6 in Palavas (Montpellier), France

 Portugal -  Switzerland 
 Spain  -  France  
 Portugal -  France  
 Spain  -  Switzerland 
 Portugal -  Spain  
 France -  Switzerland

Winner:  Portugal

BSWW tour June 19–20 in Corsica, France

 Italy 6-4 Switzerland 
 Belgium	8-7 France  [OT]

Third place match:  France 11-5 Switzerland

Final:  Belgium	8-4  Italy 

France All Star Game Oct 10 in Bercy POBB, Paris

PSG Legends	4-3 FC Porto Legends 
France All Star	5-5 Dream Team 
 Europe Sel.	3-7 Brazil

2005

BSWW tour Jan 22-23 in Amnéville, France

Semifinals
 Brazil 10-2 Portugal  
 France 7-6 Switzerland

Third place match:  Switzerland 7-6 Portugal  [OT]

Final:  Brazil		13-10 France 

 UNICEF Cup Aug 6-7 in Scheveningen, Netherlands

Semifinals
 Germany 9-5 Turkey  
 Netherlands 5-4 England 

Third place match
 Turkey 9-6 England 

Final
 Germany 5-4 Netherlands 

BSWW tour August 17–19 in Bastia (Corsica, France)

 Brazil	5-3 Spain  
 Norway 	3-1 France  
 Spain 4-3 France  
 Brazil	11-2 Norway  
 Spain 5-3 Norway  
 Brazil	5-1 France 

Winner: Brazil 
	

BSWW tour August 24–26 in Ajaccio (Corsica, France)

 Brazil	8-3 Spain  
 France 7-2 Norway  
 France 8-2 Spain  
 Brazil	12-3 Norway  
 Spain 4-0 Norway  
 Brazil	5-3 France 

Winner: Brazil

BSWW tour  Jan 15 at Praia de Jacarecica in Maceió, Alagoas, Brazil

 Brazil	6-4 World Selection

2006

BSWW tour June 21–23 in Bern

 Hungary 6-5 Switzerland  
 Hungary 10-4 Belgium  
 Hungary 9-8 Germany  
 Switzerland 8-2 Belgium  
 Switzerland 10-4 Germany  
 Belgium	6-5 Germany 

Winner:  Hungary 
		

BSWW tour June 23–25 in Birmingham

 Portugal 12-3 Netherlands  
 France 6-5 England  
 France 7-6 Netherlands 	[OT] 
 Portugal 7-4 England  
 France 8-7 Portugal  
 England 7-5 Netherlands 

Winner:  France

BSWW tour Oct 7-8 in St-Pierre de la Reunion

 Italy 3-2 Reunion	 [OT] 
 France 15-4 Madagascar 

Third place match:  Reunion 12-4 Madagascar 

Final:  France 3-3  Italy  [OT; 3-2 pen]

Friendly match Oct 6
 France 6-9 Reunion

2007

BSWW tour Jan 14 at Enseada Beach in Guarujá, Brazil

Brazil 7-6 World Selection

Nations Cup March 9–11 at Enseada Beach in Guarujá, Brazil

 France 7-2 Peru  
Brazil 8-0 Mexico  
 France 5-1 Mexico  
Brazil 9-2 Peru  
 Mexico 4-3 Peru  
Brazil 9-2 France 

Winner:Brazil

BSWW tour May 6 in Tarragona (Playa de l'Arrabassada)

Brazil 5-4 European All-Stars 

BSWW tour June 1 in Netanya, Israel

 Israel 6-5 England 

BSWW tour June 15–17 in Winterthur (Wachter Areal), Switzerland

 Portugal 6-5 England  
 Switzerland 13-1 Austria 

Third place match:  Austria 4-3 England 

Final:  Switzerland 4-1 Portugal 

BSWW tour Aug 9-10 in Netanya, Israel

 Germany 4-3 France  
 Israel 6-3 Turkey 

Third place match:  France 6-4 Turkey 

Final:  Israel 4-3 Germany 

BSWW tour Aug 17 in Zürich (Home of the FIFA), Switzerland

 Switzerland 5-10 Brazil 

BSWW tour Dec 12 at Clube Escola Édson Arantes do Nascimento (Pelézão), Brazil

 Brazil 5-0 World Selection

2008

BSWW tour Jan 18, 19 and 20, in Guaruja (São Paulo), Brazil

Brazil 4-5 Paraguay  
Brazil 7-4 Paraguay  
Brazil 4-5 Paraguay 

Rock'n Beach Soccer Jan 18-19 in Metz, France

 Portugal 8-5 Spain   
 France 5-6 Europa Sel.  [OT]

Third place match:  France 7-5 Spain 

Final:  Europa Sel.	6-5 Portugal 

BSWW tour Feb 8-10 in Eger (Hungary)

 Switzerland 3-1 Poland  
 Germany 9-8 Hungary 
 Switzerland 6-3 Germany  
 Poland 6-4 Hungary  
 Germany 4-2 Poland  
 Switzerland 10-6 Hungary  
 
winner:  Switzerland

BSWW tour April 20 in Puerto Vallarta (Mexico)

 Mexico 5-2 World Selection

4 Nations Soccer Cup May 31-June 1 in Winterthur (Wachter-Areal), Switzerland

 Portugal 10-1 Netherlands  
 Switzerland 9-2 Germany 

Third place match:  Netherlands 5-2 Germany 

Final:  Portugal 5-1 Switzerland

Challenge Cup June 25–27 in Netanya, Israel

 Turkey 7-6 Hungary  
 Czech Rep. 5-1 Norway 
 Israel 6-4 Germany  [not for the Cup]

1/2 finals
 Germany 4-1 Czech Rep. 
 Israel 11-4 Turkey 

Fifth place match
 Hungary 8-6 Norway 

Third place match
 Turkey 9-7 Czech Rep. 

Final
 Israel 4-3 Germany  	

4 Nations Soccer Cup July 12–13 in Linz, Austria

 Germany 4-3 Austria 

 Switzerland 6-4 Czech Rep. 

Third place match:  Austria 5-3 Czech Rep. 

Final:  Switzerland 6-1 Germany 

BSWW tour July 11 in Netanya, Israel

 Israel 3-11 Brazil 

BSWW tour Aug 15 in Zürich, Switzerland

 Switzerland 7-8 Brazil 

BSWW tour Sep 18 in Baku, Azerbaijan

 Spain 6-2 Azerbaijan 

Danubia Cup Nov 11 in Bratislava, Slovakia

 Switzerland 4-2 Hungary  
 Austria 4-3 Slovakia 

Third place match:  Slovakia 8-6 Hungary 

Final:  Switzerland 9-3 Austria

2009

2010

2010 Beach Soccer Worldwide Tour

Crocs Challenge Cup 2010

2011

2012

2012 Montenegro Trophy

2013

2013 Montenegro Trophy

2014

2015

2016

2017

2017 Montenegro Trophy

2017 Manila Cup

2018

2019
BSWW Tour Events in 2019
 Talent Beach Soccer Cup Hungary 2019
 Morocco Beach Soccer Cup 2019
 NASSC - US Open 2019
 InterCup St. Petersburg 2019
 Mundialito Nazaré 2019
 Neom Beach Soccer Cup 2019
 CFA Belt and Road International Beach Soccer Championship Haikou 2019

2020

2021

2022

References
Beach Soccer history results
FIFA Beach Soccer history
PBST Competition guide
RSSSF

See also
Beach soccer

Beach soccer competitions